The following is a list of conquistadors.

A
 Lope de Aguirre
 Hernando de Alarcón
 Diego de Almagro 
 Alonso de Alvarado
 Hernando de Alvarado
 Pedro de Alvarado
 Luis de Moscoso Alvarado
 Juan de Ampudia
 Pascual de Andagoya
 Pedro Arias de Ávila
 Lucas Vázquez de Ayllón
 Juan de Ayolas

B
 Hernán Sánchez de Badajoz
 Vasco Núñez de Balboa
 Rodrigo de Bastidas
 Sebastián de Belalcázar
Antonio de Berrío
 Francisco de Bobadilla

C
 Álvar Núñez Cabeza de Vaca
 Sebastian Cabot
 Juan Rodríguez Cabrillo
 Alonso de Cáceres
 Alonso Calero
 Bartolomé Camacho Zambrano
 Juan de la Cámara
 Pedro de Candia
 Francisco Cano
 Alonso de Cárdenas
 García López de Cárdenas
 Antonio Díaz de Cardoso
 Juan de Carvajal
 Juan de Cavallón
 Francisco César
 Juan de Céspedes
 Beltrán de Cetina
 Gregorio de Cetina
 Pedro Cieza de León
 Christopher Columbus
 Francisco Hernández de Córdoba (founder of Nicaragua)
 Francisco Hernández de Córdoba (Yucatán conquistador)
 Francisco Vázquez de Coronado
 Juan Vázquez de Coronado
 Hernán Cortés
 Juan de la Cosa
 Bartolomé de Las Casas

D
Alonso Díaz Moreno
Bernal Díaz del Castillo
Melchor Díaz

E
 Ambrosius Ehinger
 Martín Estete
 Juan de Estrada Rávago

F
 Francisco Fajardo
 Nikolaus Federmann
 Martín Fernández de Enciso
 Pedro Fernández de Lugo
 Pedro Fernández de Valenzuela
 Juan Freyle
 Alejandro de la Fuente

G

 Aleixo Garcia
 Diego García de Paredes
 Martín de Goiti
 Estêvão Gomes
 Gil González Dávila
Garci González de Silva
 Juan de Grijalva
 Felipe Gutiérrez
 Nuño de Guzmán

H
 Pedro de Heredia
 Miguel Holguín y Figueroa
 Philipp von Hutten

I
 Domingo Martínez de Irala

L
 Luis Lanchero
 Miguel López de Legazpi
 Diego de Losada

M
 Gonzalo Macías
 Baltasar Maldonado
Juan Maldonado
Pedro Malaver de Silva
 Luis Marin
 Diego de Mazariegos
 Pedro de Mendoza
 Pedro Menéndez de Avilés
 Pedro Menéndez de Márquez
 Gutierre de Miranda
 Diego Miruelo
 Francisco de Montejo
 Diego de Montemayor

N
 Pánfilo de Narváez 
 Diego de Nicuesa

O
 Alonso de Ojeda
 Cristóbal de Olid 
 Diego de Ordaz 
 Francisco de Orellana
 Juan de Oñate
 Rodrigo Orgóñez
Joan Orpí i del Pou

P
 Alonso Álvarez de Pineda 
 Vicente Yáñez Pinzón 
 Francisco Pizarro 
 Gonzalo Pizarro 
 Juan Pizarro
 Hernándo Pizarro
 Juan Ponce de León

Q
 Gonzalo Jiménez de Quesada
 Hernán Pérez de Quesada

R
 Diego López de Ribera
 Jorge Robledo
 Juan Rodríguez Suárez
 Gaspar de Rodas
 Diego de Roxas
 Bartolomé Ruiz

S
 Juan de Salcedo
 Juan de Sanct Martín
 Francisco "Chamuscado" Sánchez
 Gonzalo de Sandoval
Ulrico Schmidl
 Diego de Sojo
 Hernando de Soto
 Juan Díaz de Solís
 Georg von Speyer
 Gonzalo Suárez Rendón

T
 Pedro de Tovar

U
 Francisco de Ulloa
 Martín de Ursúa
 Pedro de Ursúa

V
 Pedro de Valdivia
 Juan Valiente
 Diego Velázquez de Cuéllar
 Ortún Velázquez de Velasco
 Hernán Venegas Carrillo
 Juan de Villegas

See also 

 Conquistador
 List of explorers
 Spanish colonization of the Americas
 List of conquistadors in Colombia
 Encomienda

 
 
Conquistadors